The 2008-09 Carleton University Ravens men's basketball season began on August 28, 2007 with exhibition games against NCAA Division I teams, and with regular season games beginning on November 7. The season ended when the Ravens hosted the national championships at Scotiabank Place for the second time.

Roster

Coach: Dave Smart

Pre-season

Exhibition games against NCAA Division I Teams

Exhibition games against Canadian colleges

House-Laughton Tournament

Exhibition games on the road

Rod Shoveller Memorial Tournament at Dalhousie University

Regular season

OUA Playoffs

CIS Final 8

Carleton Ravens men's basketball seasons
2008–09 in Canadian basketball by team